Vittorio Parisi (born in Milan, April 6, 1957) is an Italian conductor and teacher.

Biography
He was also Gianluigi Gelmetti's assistant for several years and attended a masterclass in the Netherlands with the Russian conductor Kirill Kondrashin. Following his debut at the Teatro Petruzzelli in Bari in 1979, went on to an international career conducting both operas and orchestral concerts in major concert halls and opera houses.

He has conducted many premieres by contemporary composers, most importantly his collaborations Luciano Berio and John Cage. He has also conducted the first performances in modern times of works such as the American version of L'ape musicale by Lorenzo Da Ponte, the first staged performances of Gian Francesco Malipiero's  Il sogno di un tramonto d'autunno, the first revival of Kurt Weill's Marie Galante,  and the first live performance of the radio opera Don Perlimplin by Bruno Maderna.

He has served as the Principal Conductor of Angelicum Orchestra in Milan (1984–88), Associate Conductor of the Filarmonica del Conservatorio di Milano (2000–2003) and Artistic Director and Principal Conductor of I Solisti Aquilani in L'Aquila (2003–2005). In the contemporary music field he has been the Artistic Director and Principal Conductor of the Dedalo Ensemble in Brescia since 1995.

He has recorded for many labels, including Naxos, Dynamic, Bongiovanni, La Nuova Era, and Stradivarius. His performance of the New World Symphony by Dvorak with the Auckland Philharmonia was chosen as New Zealand Radio's first classical podcast.

Parisi is Head of conducting department at the Milan Conservatory where he has taught conducting since 1997.  Vittorio Parisi lives in Brescia, Italy.

Discography
L. DA PONTE: L'Ape musicale. Nuova Era
WAGENSEIL-KRUMPHOLTZ-DUSSEK: Harp Concertoes. Naxos
I. CAPITANIO: Pasqua Fiorentina. Bongiovanni
C. TOGNI: Barrabas - F.MARGOLA: Il mito di Caino. Bongiovanni
S. MERCADANTE: Flute concertoes. Dynamic
F. MARGOLA: Kinderkonzert nr 1 & 2, Trittico per archi, Notturno e Fuga per archi. Bongiovanni
G. CRESTA, A. GENTILUCCI, F. VACCHI, M. CESA: Rotte Sonore. Stradivarius

External links
Vittorio Parisi Official Website
Vittorio Parisi on Naxos Classical Music
Dedalo ensemble

1957 births
Italian male conductors (music)
Living people
Musicians from Milan
21st-century Italian conductors (music)
21st-century Italian male musicians